Maksim Vladimirovich Mineyev (born 30 January 1984) is a Russian former professional football player.

Club career
He played two seasons in the Russian Football National League for FC Volga Ulyanovsk and FC Nosta Novotroitsk.

External links
 
 

1984 births
People from Baryshsky District
Living people
Russian footballers
Association football defenders
FC Mordovia Saransk players
FC Dynamo Barnaul players
Crimean Premier League players
FC Nosta Novotroitsk players
FC Volga Ulyanovsk players
FC Dynamo Kirov players
Sportspeople from Ulyanovsk Oblast